The 11th Royal Tank Regiment (11 RTR) was an armoured regiment of the British Army. It is part of the Royal Tank Regiment, itself part of the Royal Armoured Corps.

History
The 11th Royal Tank Regiment was raised during World War II in January 1941 and designated for the Canal Defence Light (CDL) role in May 1941. The unit trained at Lowther Castle near Penrith, and was based at Brougham Hall, Cumberland. It spent 1942 and 1943 in the Middle East without seeing action, returning to the UK in April 1944. 11 RTR formed part of 79th Armoured Division (aka Hobart's Funnies), equipped initially with CDL (tactical searchlight) tanks. It landed in Normandy on 12 August 1944, seeing no action until 29 September 1944, when it was ordered to transfer all of its equipment to the 42nd and 49th Royal Tank Regiments, and was retrained to operate the American amphibious LVT-4, known by the British Army as the Buffalo Mark IV. Not long after D-Day (6 June 1944) 11 RTR converted to Buffalo (U.S. LVT aka Amtrac), and participated in Operation Plunder, the assault crossing of the River Rhine. Prime Minister Winston Churchill was ferried across the Rhine in a Buffalo from 'C' Squadron 11RTR.
In the book "the story of the 79th Armoured Division" created and published by the 79th Armoured Division themselves in 1945, it states that Winston Churchill was transported across the Rhine by 'B' Squadron of 11 Royal Tanks.

References

External links
 Royal Tank Regiment Association
 Video of Winston Churchill Crossing The Rhine Moments After Battle

Royal Tank Regiment